Michael Caine is an English actor who has appeared in over 130 films and has had multiple television appearances. Caine's acting career began in the 1950s, when he was cast in many small, often uncredited roles in British films. Caine gained recognition as one of the most famous actors of the 1960s through his breakthrough role in the film Zulu (1964). He then portrayed spy Harry Palmer in the films The Ipcress File (1965), Funeral in Berlin (1966) and Billion Dollar Brain (1967). He also had starring roles in The Italian Job and Battle of Britain (1969). His role in Sleuth (1972) led him to an Academy Award for Best Actor nomination. Caine has won a Best Supporting Actor Oscar for the films Hannah and Her Sisters (1986) and The Cider House Rules (1999). More recently, Caine has gained a new following through his collaborations with British-American filmmaker Christopher Nolan in The Dark Knight Trilogy films, as well as The Prestige (2006), Inception (2010), Interstellar (2014), Dunkirk (2017) and Tenet (2020).

Film

Television

Video games

Note: in The Italian Job (2001 video game), Caine's voice (as Charlie Croker) was impersonated by Phil Cornwell

Box office ranking
At his peak, exhibitors voted Michael Caine one of the most popular stars at the box office:
1966 – 2nd (UK)
1967 – 15th (US)
1969 – 3rd (UK)
1970 – 8th (UK)
1971 – 4th (UK)

References

External links
 

Male actor filmographies
British filmographies